Chambly County was a county of Quebec that existed between 1855 and the early 1980s. The territory of the county today forms part of the Montérégie administrative region and the Urban agglomeration of Longueuil and the Regional county municipality of la Vallée-du-Richelieu. The county seat was Longueuil.

Municipalities situated within the county
Boucherville
Carignan (formerly Saint-Joseph-de-Chambly)
Chambly
Greenfield Park (merged into Longueuil)
Ville Jacques-Cartier (merged into Longueuil)
LeMoyne (merged into Longueuil)
Longueuil
Montréal-Sud (merged into Longueuil)
Saint-Bruno-de-Montarville
Saint-Hubert (merged into Longueuil)
Saint-Lambert

See also
List of Quebec counties

References 

Chambly
History of Montérégie